Nigel Anthony (born December 23, 1941) is a theatre, television, and radio actor. His theatre work includes Twelfth Night, Dutch Uncle, Happy End, The Taming of the Shrew for the Royal Shakespeare Company and seasons at Scarborough and Chichester. Television appearances include Ted Roach in Casualty (series 1 and 2) The Diary of Anne Frank, Coronation Street, Midsomer Murders and Doctors.

He has spent a large part of his career working in radio drama where he won a Sony award and a Radio Times award.

Anthony had three sons with his first wife, actor Deborah Millington (now divorced). Two of his sons are distinguished documentary film makers, producer/director Sam Anthony (My Life As A Rolling Stone,  Art That Made Us) and four time BAFTA award winning director Ben Anthony.

He was married to Deborah Millington (1964–1976) – marriage dissolved; Kate Binchy (1979–2017) – marriage dissolved; Debra Erskine 2017– to present.

References

External links

1941 births
Living people
British male television actors
British male voice actors
Audiobook narrators
British male stage actors
British historians
British male radio actors